Eslah Nejad Intersection is an intersection in southern central Shiraz, Iran. It is a junction between Enqelab-e Eslami Street and Eslah Nejad Street which connects the intersection to Emam Hasan (Fakhr Abad) Square at the east.

Transportation

Streets
 Enqelab-e Eslami Street
 Eslah Nejad Street

Buses
 Route 4
 Route 18
 Route 90
 Route 91
 Route 93
 Route 99

Streets in Shiraz